is a Japanese professional footballer currently playing as a goalkeeper for Shimizu S-Pulse.

Career statistics

Club
.

References

External links

Profile at Shimizu S-Pulse

2000 births
Living people
Sportspeople from Shizuoka Prefecture
Association football people from Shizuoka Prefecture
Japanese footballers
Japan youth international footballers
Association football goalkeepers
J1 League players
Shimizu S-Pulse players
Fagiano Okayama players